In the 2005–06 season, the Azerbaijan First Division (the second tier of professional football in Azerbaijan) was contested by 16 teams. The winning team was Gilan (aka Gabala).

League table

Azerbaijan First Division seasons
2005–06 in Azerbaijani football
Azer